Your Very Good Health is a 1948 British animated short film and public information film about the foundation of the National Health Service (NHS). It explains how people would be affected by the National Health Service Act 1946 introduced under Clement Attlee.

Synopsis
As Charley cycles around his neighbourhood, a narrator explains the aims and merits of the National Health Service Act. The narrator lists other public health services in existence at the time, and mentions problems with healthcare in Britain, such as the inconsistent coverage provided by hospitals and the limitations of the current insurance scheme for low-paid workers.

Responding to Charley's objections, the film depicts hypothetical scenarios involving Charley falling off his bicycle and his wife becoming ill, in order to illustrate the benefits of the new national health system. The previously doubtful Charley is convinced, and proceeds to convince his neighbour George of the advantages of the new NHS.

Production
Your Very Good Health was one of a series of government-funded propaganda films featuring the cartoon character Charley, which were produced to educate the public changes introduced under the postwar Labour government. Charley had been created in 1946 by Joy Batchelor, and this was the second film featuring him. Different government departments funded the various films, with Your Very Good Health being sponsored by the Central Office of Information for the Ministry of Health.

References

External links
 Your Very Good Health at BFI Screenonline
 Film transcript at The National Archives
 

1940s English-language films
1948 animated films
1948 short films
1940s animated short films
Public information films
British animated short films
British black-and-white films
1940s educational films
Halas and Batchelor films
National Health Service
Animated films set in the United Kingdom
Films about health care
Films directed by John Halas
1940s British films
British educational films